The Egyptian is a 1954 American epic historical drama film made by 20th Century Fox. Filmed in CinemaScope with color by DeLuxe, it was directed by Michael Curtiz and produced by Darryl F. Zanuck. It is based on Mika Waltari's 1945 novel of the same name and the screenplay was adapted by Philip Dunne and Casey Robinson. Leading roles were played by Edmund Purdom, Bella Darvi, Jean Simmons, Victor Mature, Gene Tierney, Peter Ustinov, and Michael Wilding. Cinematographer Leon Shamroy was nominated for an Oscar in 1955.

Plot
Sinuhe (Edmund Purdom), a struggling physician in 18th dynasty Egypt (14th century BC), is thrown by chance into contact with the pharaoh Akhnaton (Michael Wilding). He rises to and falls from great prosperity, wanders the world, and becomes increasingly drawn towards a new religion spreading throughout Egypt. His companions throughout are his lover, a shy tavern maid named Merit (Jean Simmons); and his corrupt but likable servant, Kaptah (Peter Ustinov).

While out lion hunting with his sturdy friend Horemheb (Victor Mature), Sinuhe discovers Egypt's newly ascendant pharaoh Akhnaton, who has sought the solitude of the desert in the midst of a religious epiphany. While praying, the ruler is stricken with an epileptic seizure, with which Sinuhe is able to help him. The grateful Akhnaton makes his savior court physician and gives Horemheb a post in the Royal Guard, a career previously denied to him by low birth. His new eminence gives Sinuhe an inside look at Akhnaton's reign, which is made extraordinary by the ruler's devotion to a new religion that he feels has been divinely revealed to him. This faith rejects Egypt's traditional gods in favor of monolatristic worship of the sun, referred to as Aten. Akhnaton intends to promote Atenism throughout Egypt, which earns him the hatred of the country's corrupt and politically active traditional priesthood.

Life in court does not prove to be good for Sinuhe; it drags him away from his previous ambition of helping the poor and he falls obsessively in love with a Babylonian courtesan named Nefer (Bella Darvi). He squanders all of his and his parents' property in order to buy her gifts, only to have her reject him nonetheless. Returning dejectedly home, Sinuhe learns that his parents have committed suicide over his shameful behavior. He has their bodies embalmed so that they can pass on to the afterlife, and, having no way to pay for the service, works off his debts in the embalming house.

Lacking a tomb in which to put his parents' mummies, Sinuhe buries them in the sand amid the lavish funerary complexes of the Valley of the Kings. Merit finds him there and warns him that Akhnaton has condemned him to death; one of the pharaoh's daughters fell ill and died while Sinuhe was working as an embalmer, and the tragedy is being blamed on his desertion of the court. Merit urges Sinuhe to flee Egypt and rebuild his career elsewhere, and the two of them share one night of passion before he takes ship out of the country.

For the next ten years, Sinuhe and Kaptah wander the known world, where Sinuhe's superior Egyptian medical training gives him an excellent reputation as a healer. Sinuhe finally saves enough money from his fees to return home; he buys his way back into the favor of the court with a precious piece of military intelligence he learned abroad, informing Horemheb (now commander of the Egyptian army) that the barbarian Hittites plan to attack the country with superior iron weapons.

Akhnaton is in any case ready to forgive Sinuhe, according to his religion's doctrine of mercy and pacifism. These qualities have made Aten-worship extremely popular amid the common people, including Merit, with whom Sinuhe is reunited. He finds that she bore him a son named Thoth (Tommy Rettig), a result of their night together many years ago, who shares his father's interest in medicine.

Meanwhile, the priests of the old gods have been fomenting hate crimes against the Aten's devotees, and now urge Sinuhe to help them kill Akhnaton and put Horemheb on the throne instead. The physician is privately given extra inducement by the princess Baketamun (Gene Tierney); she reveals that he is actually the son of the previous pharaoh by a concubine, discarded at birth because of the jealousy of the old queen and raised by foster parents. The princess now suggests that Sinuhe could poison both Akhnaton and Horemheb and rule Egypt himself (with her at his side).

Sinuhe is still reluctant to perform this evil deed until the Egyptian army mounts a full attack on worshipers of the Aten. Kaptah manages to smuggle Thoth out of the country, but Merit is killed while seeking refuge at the new god's altar. In his grief, Sinuhe blames Akhnaton for the whole mess and administers poison to him at their next meeting. The pharaoh realizes what has been done, but accepts his fate. He still believes his faith is true, but that he has understood it imperfectly; future generations will be able to spread the same faith better than he. Enlightened by Akhnaton's dying words, Sinuhe warns Horemheb that his wine is also poisoned, thus allowing him to marry the Princess and become Pharaoh.

Later, Sinuhe is brought before his old friend for preaching the same ideals Akhnaton believed in and is sentenced to be exiled to the shores of the Red Sea, where he spends his remaining days writing down his life story, in the hope that it may be found by Thoth or his descendants. Ultimately it is revealed that "These things happened thirteen centuries before the birth of Jesus Christ".

Cast

 Edmund Purdom as Sinuhe
 Victor Mature as Horemheb
 Jean Simmons as Merit
 Bella Darvi as Nefer
 Gene Tierney as Baketamon
 Michael Wilding as Akhenaten
 Peter Ustinov as Kaptah
 Judith Evelyn as Taia
 Henry Daniell as Mekere
 John Carradine as Grave robber
 Carl Benton Reid as Senmut
 Tommy Rettig as Thoth
 Anitra Stevens as Queen Nefertiti
 Michael Ansara as Hittite Commander

Original novel
The script was based on the Waltari novel of the same name. It is elaborated in the book, but not the film, that Sinuhe was named by his mother from the Story of Sinuhe, which does include references to Aten but was written many centuries before the 18th dynasty. The use of the "Cross of Life" ankh to represent Akhnaton's "new" religion reflects a popular and esoteric belief in the 1950s that monolatristic Atenism was a sort of proto-Christianity. Historically the ankh is not the iconographic ancestor of the Christian cross, and the principal symbol of Aten was not an ankh but a solar disk emitting rays, though the rays usually ended with a hand holding out an ankh to the worshipers. The sun-disk is seen only twice; when we first meet Akhnaton in the desert, he has painted it on a rock, and Sinuhe says "Look! He worships the face of the sun." It appears again as part of the wall painting above Akhnaton's throne. With that said, the ankh was used in the original novel. Likewise, Akhnaton's dying revelation that God is much more than the face of the sun is actually found among Waltari's best-known writings.

The best-selling novel was also well-received critically, with the New York Times describing it as "fine and panoramic".

Development
Darryl F. Zanuck of 20th Century Fox bought the film rights in 1952. He announced the film would be his only personal production in 1953. Marlon Brando was going to play the lead and Casey Robinson would write the script. Robinson finished his script in March 1953. In April, Fox announced the film would be shot in its new wide-screen technology, CinemaScope. Zanuck borrowed Michael Curtiz from Paramount to direct. In November 1953 Victor Mature joined the cast along with Jean Peters and Kirk Douglas. In January 1954, Fox said the cast would also include Betta St. John, Peter Ustinov, and Bella Darvi.

It was the film debut of Darvi, who was a protege of Zanuck and his wife Virginia ("Darvi" was a combination of "Darryl" and "Virginia"). She eventually became Darryl Zanuck's mistress. By January, Peters was out and replaced by Jean Simmons, so only the right half of publicity materials had to be changed. In October 1953, Philip Dunne signed a new three-year contract with Fox and joined the film. Dunne said Robinson had done "a pretty good script" which was ultimately done in by "casting". Dunne says he worked on the film as an "unofficial producer".

There were a number of Egyptian-themed films made around this time, including Valley of the Kings and Land of the Pharaohs.

Marlon Brando quits
In February 1954, a week before filming was to start, Brando took part in a reading of the script. Dunne says Brando read the part "absolutely beautifully" but then Curtiz said "How can I with all my genius make you play this man who is one minute hero the next moment villain?" Dunne says he went home to write a memo for Curtiz then got a call saying Brando had quit the film. Brando said he was unable to play his part due to mental strain and had his psychiatrist support him. As location filming in Egypt had already started, Fox sued Brando for $2 million.

Filming was postponed. Fox tried to borrow Dirk Bogarde from J. Arthur Rank in Britain. Hedda Hopper suggested John Cassavetes. Cameron Mitchell, then a Fox contract star tested for the role of the Pharaoh. Farley Granger was the next choice and considered the role, but then decided he was not interested after having just moved to New York. Other contenders for the role had been John Derek and Cameron Mitchell, who were all screen tested. Eventually the role went to Edmund Purdom borrowed from MGM. MGM took $300,000 for Purdom's services although he was only paid $500 a week. Cassavetes later credited Hopper for helping to kick-start his career in Hollywood by her public push for him.

Philip Dunne later said he tried to get Zanuck to cast Cassavetes as the Pharaoh but Zanuck wanted an English actor to play it. "He thought all kings, emperors and nobility should be played by English actors", said Dunne. Michael Wilding played the part. Dunne says he also wanted Dana Wynter to play Nefertiti – he thought the actress just looked like the real queen – but instead "Zanuck let Michael Curtiz cast some lumpish girlfriend who looked about as much like Nefertiti as you or I do."

Fox's lawsuit against Brando was resolved when the actor agreed to make Désirée (1954) for the studio.

Production
Filming began in May 1954.

Some of the sets, costumes, and props from this film were bought and re-used by Cecil B. DeMille for The Ten Commandments (1956). As the events in that story take place seventy years after those in The Egyptian, this re-use creates an unintended sense of continuity. The commentary track on the Ten Commandments DVD points out many of these re-uses. Only three actors, Mimi Gibson, Michael Ansara and John Carradine, and a handful of extras, appeared in both pictures. The Prince Aly Khan was a consultant during filming; he was engaged to Gene Tierney.

Dunne recalls during filming "Darryl was so besotten [with Darvi] he decided to go around to our film stills department and see how she looked in her costumes. He'd been running the lot for 25 years, but didn't know where it was and flew into a rage. It was right next door to his private dining room."

Music

Owing to the short time available in post-production, the composing duties on the film score were divided between two of 20th Century-Fox's best-known composers: Alfred Newman and Bernard Herrmann.

Newman would later conduct the score in a re-recording for release on Decca Records. Musician John Morgan undertook a "restoration and reconstruction" of the score for a recording conducted by William T. Stromberg in 1998, on Marco Polo Records. The performance of the score recorded for the film was released by Film Score Monthly in 2001.

Home video
The film has been released on DVD and there are several Blu-rays, including bootlegs from Brazil and Spain. Legitimate HD releases have appeared in America (Twilight Time), France (Sidonis Calysta), Denmark (Soul Media), and Japan (Mermaid Films). The region 0 US disc's 2010 transfer has a drastically revised color scheme, which afflicted numerous Fox restorations carried out at the same time. The other discs, which are region-locked, have a more accurate 2005 transfer.

See also
 List of historical drama films
 List of American films of 1954
 List of epic films

References

External links

 
 
 
 
 
 Listing of recordings of the film score

1954 films
American epic films
Films directed by Michael Curtiz
Films scored by Alfred Newman
Films scored by Bernard Herrmann
Films about religion
20th Century Fox films
1950s English-language films
Films based on Finnish novels
Films based on works by Mika Waltari
Films set in ancient Egypt
Films set in the 14th century BC
American drama films
Cultural depictions of Akhenaten
Cultural depictions of Nefertiti
Films with screenplays by Philip Dunne
Films produced by Darryl F. Zanuck
CinemaScope films
1950s American films